Volotea is a Spanish low-cost airline that offers operates flights within Europe and North Africa. The large majority of their routes originate or end in the countries of France, Greece, Italy and Spain. Volotea no longer served Asia when they terminated services to Ben Gurion Airport in Tel Aviv, Israel. The following list is adapted from Volotea's official website.

List

References

External links
 Map of Volotea routes and destinations

Lists of airline destinations